Diceratura rhodograpta is a species of moth of the family Tortricidae. It is found on Sardinia and in France, Italy, North Macedonia, Ukraine, the Transcaucasus, Asia Minor and northern Syria.

The wingspan is 8–10 mm. Adults are on wing from July to August.

References

Moths described in 1929
Cochylini